The Rharian Field was located in Eleusis in Greece and was supposedly where the first plot of grain was grown after Demeter (through Triptolemus) taught humanity agriculture. It was associated with the Eleusinian Mysteries.

Demeter was often given the epithet Rharias after the field, or after its mythical eponym Rarus.

References

Ancient Greek religion
Eleusinian Mysteries
Locations in Greek mythology